Stefano Basalini (born 29 November 1977 in Borgomanero) is an Italian rower.

References

External links 
 

1977 births
Living people
Italian male rowers
World Rowing Championships medalists for Italy
People from Borgomanero